A gendarmerie is a police force that is generally part of the armed forces of a country, and is responsible for policing the civilian population (and usually the armed forces as well.)

Organisations whose names contain the word "gendarmerie" include:

Argentine National Gendarmerie
Chadian National Gendarmerie
Chilean Gendarmerie
Corps of Gendarmerie of San Marino
Corps of Gendarmerie of Vatican City
Cretan Gendarmerie
Djiboutian National Gendarmerie
European Gendarmerie Force
Feldgendarmerie (Nazi Germany)
Gendarmerie (Austria)
Gendarmerie (Belgium)
Gendarmerie (Bulgaria)
Gendarmerie (Switzerland)
Gendarmerie (Turkey)
Gendarmerie Nationale (Benin)
Gendarmerie Nationale (Cameroon)
Gendarmerie Nationale (France)
Air Gendarmerie
Air Transport Gendarmerie
Departmental Gendarmerie
Maritime Gendarmerie
Mobile Gendarmerie
Gendarmerie Nationale (Gabon)
Gendarmerie Nationale (Madagascar)
Gendarmerie Nationale (Mali)
Gendarmerie Nationale (Mauritania)
Gendarmerie Nationale (Niger)
Gendarmerie Nationale (Rwanda)
Gendarmerie Nationale (Senegal)
Gendarmerie Nationale Togolaise
Gendarmery (Serbia)
Grand Ducal Gendarmerie
Greek Gendarmerie
Iranian Gendarmerie
National Gendarmerie (Burkina Faso)
Romanian Gendarmerie
Royal Moroccan Gendarmerie
Russian Gendarmerie